This is a list of notable members of Alpha Chi Rho.

Alpha Chi Rho
Brothers